Joan Logue (1942) is an American video artist. Logue was born in McKeesport, Pennsylvania. 

Her work is included in the collection of the National Gallery of Canada, the Museum of Modern Art, New York, the ZKM Center for Art and Media Karlsruhe, the Chicago Video Data Bank and in the Museo Reina Sofia in Madrid, Spain.

References

1942 births
20th-century American women artists
20th-century American artists
21st-century American women artists
21st-century American artists
People from McKeesport, Pennsylvania
Living people
Artists from Pennsylvania
American video artists
Women video artists